John Patrick Lennox (21 March 1907 – 7 December 1943) was an Australian WWII serviceman and prisoner of war. He had played rugby league in the New South Wales premiership competition with St. George and South Sydney in the 1930s.

Background
Lennox was born in Mudgee, New South Wales on 21 March 1907.

Career
Lennox started his first grade career with St. George in 1930. He made an appearance with the side in Game 1 of the 1930 Country Carnival. He scored a try, helping his team defeat North Coast 21-9.

He made his debut with the team in a round 5 in a 10-7 win over North Sydney. He scored his debut try against Western Suburbs in round 11, helping St. George win 19-9. Two rounds later, he scored his second career try in a win over South Sydney. Lennox played in St. George's 14-6 win against Wests in the 1930 grand final. Wests however, were allowed a grand final challenge, and defeated St. George 27-2 to win the premiership.

In round 14 of the 1931 season, Lennox scored a try in a loss to Newtown.

Lennox made 14 appearances in the 1932 season. St. George failed to qualify for the finals, finishing the season sixth.

In 1933, Lennox signed with South Sydney. He made his debut with the club in the opening round of the 1933 season against Newtown. He played 6 games that year, playing primarily as a lock.

Lennox was reverted to centre for the 1934 season. He scored a try against Balmain in round 7. His final game of his career was in a 7-18 round 10 loss to his former club St. George.

War service and death
Jack Lennox enlisted in the Australian Army in 1941 to fight in World War II. He was a gunner in the 2/15th Field Regiment (Australia). The 2/15th regiment defended Singapore in 1941, were pushed back to the city and were captured by Japanese forces at the Fall of Singapore. Jack Lennox was made a prisoner of war of the Japanese, and died in a prison camp on 7 December 1943. He is listed on the Roll of Honor in his home town of Mudgee, New South Wales.

References

Australian rugby league players
St. George Dragons players
South Sydney Rabbitohs players
Australian military personnel killed in World War II
1907 births
1943 deaths
Rugby league centres
Rugby league players from New South Wales
Australian Army personnel of World War II
Australian Army soldiers
Australian prisoners of war
World War II prisoners of war held by Japan